The 2023 Nigerian presidential election in Kano State will be held on 25 February 2023 as part of the nationwide 2023 Nigerian presidential election to elect the president and vice president of Nigeria. Other federal elections, including elections to the House of Representatives and the Senate, will also be held on the same date while state elections will be held two weeks afterward on 11 March.

Background
Kano State is a highly populated northwestern state mainly inhabited by ethnic Hausas and Fulanis but with significant non-indigenous populations of Igbo, Yoruba, and other ethnicities. The state has a growing economy but is facing an underdeveloped agricultural sector, overcrowded urban areas, desertification, and relatively low education rates.

Politically, the state's 2019 elections were categorized as a reassertion of the APC's federal dominance after mass 2018 defections away from the party led by outgoing Senator Rabiu Musa Kwankwaso and his allies. The APC was mainly successful federally, unseating almost all PDP senators and house members to sweep most House of Representatives and all three senate seats as the state was easily won by APC presidential nominee Muhammadu Buhari with over 75% but still swung towards the PDP and had lower turnout. However, state level elections were much closer as Umar Ganduje needed a disputed supplementary election to barely beat the PDP's Abba Kabir Yusuf; the House of Assembly elections were also closer but the APC won a sizeable majority.

Polling

Projections

General election

Results

By senatorial district 
The results of the election by senatorial district.

By federal constituency
The results of the election by federal constituency.

By local government area 
The results of the election by local government area.

See also 
 2023 Kano State elections
 2023 Nigerian presidential election

Notes

References 

Kano State gubernatorial election
2023 Kano State elections
Kano